California's 8th State Assembly district is one of 80 California State Assembly districts. It is currently represented by Democrat Ken Cooley of Rancho Cordova.

District profile 
The district is wholly contained in Sacramento County and encompasses most of the eastern Sacramento suburbs.

Sacramento County – 32.7%
 Arden-Arcade
 Carmichael
 Citrus Heights
 Foothill Farms
 Gold River
 La Riviera
 North Highlands – partial
 Rancho Cordova
 Rancho Murieta
 Rosemont
 Vineyard
 Wilton

Election results from statewide races

List of Assembly Members
Due to redistricting, the 8th district has been moved around different parts of the state. The current iteration resulted from the 2011 redistricting by the California Citizens Redistricting Commission.

Election results 1992 - present

2020

2018

2016

2014

2012

2010

2008

2006

2004

2002

2000

1998

1996

1994

1992

See also 
 California State Assembly
 California State Assembly districts
 Districts in California

References

External links 
 District map from the California Citizens Redistricting Commission

08
Government of Sacramento County, California
Carmichael, California
Citrus Heights, California
Rancho Cordova, California